Clarence Belden Little (November 18, 1857 – September 25, 1941) was an American attorney and politician who served as a member of the North Dakota Senate from North Dakota's admission in 1889 to 1909. He was, throughout that time, chairman of the Judiciary Committee.

He died in Saint Paul, Minnesota on September 25, 1941.

References

1857 births
1941 deaths
20th-century American politicians
North Dakota lawyers
Republican Party North Dakota state senators
Dartmouth College alumni
Harvard Law School alumni